The bull pipefish (Syngnathus springeri) is a pipefish species of the western Atlantic, from southern Canada to Panama. It is a marine subtropical reef-associated fish, up to  length.

References

bull pipefish
Fish of the Western Atlantic
Fish of the Eastern United States
Fish of the Caribbean
Fish of the Gulf of Mexico
Fauna of the Southeastern United States
bull pipefish